The Lagoon Nebula (catalogued as Messier 8 or M8, NGC 6523, Sharpless 25, RCW 146, and Gum 72) is a giant interstellar cloud in the constellation Sagittarius. It is classified as an emission nebula and as an H II region.

The Lagoon Nebula was discovered by Giovanni Hodierna before 1654 and is one of only two star-forming nebulae faintly visible to the eye from mid-northern latitudes. Seen with binoculars, it appears as a distinct cloud-like patch with a definite core. Within the nebula is the open cluster NGC 6530.

Characteristics 
The Lagoon Nebula is estimated to be between 4,000–6,000 light-years away from the Earth. In the sky of Earth, it spans 90' by 40', which translates to an actual dimension of 110 by 50 light years. Like many nebulae, it appears pink in time-exposure color photos but is gray to the eye peering through binoculars or a telescope, human vision having poor color sensitivity at low light levels. The nebula contains a number of Bok globules (dark, collapsing clouds of protostellar material), the most prominent of which have been catalogued by E. E. Barnard as B88, B89 and B296. It also includes a funnel-like or tornado-like structure caused by a hot O-type star that emanates ultraviolet light, heating and ionizing gases on the surface of the nebula. The Lagoon Nebula also contains at its centre a structure known as the Hourglass Nebula (so named by John Herschel), which should not be confused with the better known Engraved Hourglass Nebula in the constellation of Musca. In 2006, four Herbig–Haro objects were detected within the Hourglass, providing direct evidence of active star formation by accretion within it.

See also 
 List of Messier objects
 Lists of nebulae

Image Gallery

References

External links 

 Breaking Waves in the Stellar Lagoon — ESA/Hubble Photo Release
 Messier 8, SEDS Messier pages
 NightSkyInfo.com – M8, the Lagoon Nebula
 Messier 8, Pete's Astrophotography Gallery 
 Messier 8, Lagoon Nebula, Map
 Astronomy Picture of the Day (APOD): Lagoon Nebula 
 APOD: 2005 August 3 - The Busy Center of the Lagoon Nebula
 The Scale of the Universe (Astronomy Picture of the Day 2012 March 12)
 
 Lagoon Nebula (M8) on Constellation Guide
 7/30/2015 Photo release Hubble Space Telescope

Carina–Sagittarius Arm
H II regions
Messier objects
NGC objects
Sagittarius (constellation)
Sharpless objects
Astronomical objects discovered in 1654
Articles containing video clips
Star-forming regions